The ligne, or line or Paris line, is a historic unit of length used in France and elsewhere prior to the adoption of the metric system in the late 18th century, and used in various sciences after that time. The loi du 19 frimaire an VIII (Law of 10 December 1799) states that one metre is equal to exactly 443.296 French lines.

It is vestigially retained today by French and Swiss watchmakers to measure the size of watch casings,  in button making and in ribbon manufacture.

Current use

Watchmaking

There are 12 lignes to one French inch (pouce). The standardized conversion for a ligne is 2.2558291 mm (1 mm = 0.443296 ligne), and it is abbreviated with the letter L or represented by the triple prime, .  One ligne is the equivalent of 0.0888 international inch.

This is comparable in size to the British measurement called "line" (one-twelfth of an English inch), used prior to 1824. (The French inch at that time was slightly larger than the English one, but the system of 12 inches to a foot and 12 lines to an inch was the same in both cases.)

Hatmaking
Ligne is used in measuring the width of ribbons in men's hat bands, at 11.26 per international inch.

Button making
The button trade uses the term ligne (sometimes "line"), but with a substantially different definition: .

See also

Notes

References 

Obsolete units of measurement
Units of length